Dohneh (also Romanized as Dahaneh; also known as Dūḩīeh, Dūhina, and Dukhna) is a village in Dast Jerdeh Rural District, Chavarzaq District, Tarom town, Zanjan Province, Iran. At the 2006 census, its population was 685, in 163 families.

References 

Populated places in Tarom County